Evol may refer to:

 Evol (Sonic Youth album), 1986
 Evol (Future album), 2016
 EvoL, South Korean girl group
 "E.V.O.L.", a song by Marina and the Diamonds
 'Kamen Rider Evol', the main antagonist of a Japanese tokusatsu series, Kamen Rider Build